Stephanie Kay Panabaker (born May 2, 1990) is an American zoologist and retired actress. She is best known for her roles as Jenny Garison in the 2009 reboot of Fame, Debbie Berwick on Phil of the Future, and Nikki Westerly on Summerland. She is the younger sister of Danielle Panabaker.

Early years
Panabaker was born in Orange, Texas, to Donna (née Mayock) and Harold Panabaker. Following in older sister Danielle's footsteps, she started acting at various community theatres in Chicago, Philadelphia, and Atlanta. In Naperville, Illinois she attended Crone Middle School for sixth grade, and moved to Los Angeles at the start of seventh grade.

Between projects, Panabaker focused on academics. She graduated from high school as the valedictorian when she was 13 years old. Kay received two academic scholarships from Glendale Community College, where she studied acting and was on the Dean's list. She graduated with an associate degree with honors when she was 15. She was accepted by the University of California, Los Angeles (UCLA), History Program as a junior and completed her Bachelor of Arts in history before she turned 18.

Career

Panabaker has guest starred in several television dramas and soap operas. She portrayed Alice Brand in 7th Heaven, Melissa Rue in ER, Sara in Port Charles, Carrie Bauer in The Brothers García, Ellisha in Medium, and Lindsey Willows in CSI: Crime Scene Investigation, to name a few. In film, she appeared in Dead Heat as Sam LaRoche; and did some voice work in the Disney/Pixar film, Monsters, Inc.. Panabaker's breakout role came when she starred in The WB's Summerland as Nikki Westerly, in the 2004–05 season. She also appeared as George in Nancy Drew (2007) alongside Emma Roberts and Amy Bruckner.

Panabaker had a recurring role in Phil of the Future as strait-laced Debbie Berwick, a friend of and foil to Pim Diffy (played by Amy Bruckner). She starred in Life Is Ruff as Emily Watson alongside Kyle Massey and Mitchel Musso. In July 2006, she starred in the Disney Channel Original Movie Read It and Weep (based on the book How My Private Personal Journal Became a Bestseller), in which her sister Danielle also stars. In 2006, Panabaker was in the first Disney Channel Games, on the Red Team with Zac Efron, Anneliese van der Pol, Moises Arias, Dylan Sprouse, and Shin Koyamada as part of the Disney Channel's So Hot Summer!.  Her movies include Moondance Alexander and The Prince and the Pauper with Dylan and Cole Sprouse. Panabaker starred in the remake of Fame as Jenny, an actress; the film was released in theaters on September 25, 2009.  She also played the teenaged Kitty Walker on Brothers & Sisters.

Panabaker starred in the ABC sci-fi drama series No Ordinary Family, which ran for a single season ending in 2011 after 20 episodes. In 2011, Panabaker played Samantha Caldone in the ABC Family movie Cyberbully.

After playing Rosa in Beverly Hills Chihuahua 3: Viva la Fiesta in 2012, Panabaker retired from acting. She went on to study zoology at UCLA. As of 2016 she works as a zookeeper at Disney's Animal Kingdom at Walt Disney World.

Filmography

Film

Television

Music video

Awards and honors
Panabaker previously held a Seat on the National Board of the Coalition for Quality Children's Media. As of 2020 this was no longer the case.

References

External links

 
 
 Kay Panabaker on Instagram

1990 births
21st-century American actresses
21st-century American zoologists
Actresses from Texas
American child actresses
American film actresses
American television actresses
American voice actresses
Glendale Community College (California) alumni
Living people
Animal trainers
People from Orange, Texas
University of California, Los Angeles alumni
Walt Disney Parks and Resorts people